Catherine Chidgey (born 8 April 1970) is a New Zealand novelist, short-story writer and university lecturer. Her honours include the inaugural Prize in Modern Letters; the Katherine Mansfield Fellowship to Menton, France; Best First Book at both the New Zealand Book Awards and the Commonwealth Writers' Prize (South East Asia and Pacific Region); the Acorn Foundation Fiction Prize at the Ockham New Zealand Book Awards; and the Janet Frame Fiction Prize.

Early life and family
Chidgey was born in Auckland and grew up in the Hutt Valley. At Victoria University of Wellington she completed a BSc in Psychology, and a BA in German Language and Literature. In 1993 she was awarded a German Academic Exchange Service scholarship to study at the Freie Universität Berlin. She returned to Victoria University in 1997 to complete an MA in Creative Writing under Bill Manhire.

 she lives in Hamilton with her husband and daughter. Chidgey has explained that the 13-year gap between her third and fourth novels was due to infertility issues keeping her from writing; she and her husband finally had their daughter in 2015.

Career

Early novels
Her debut novel, In a Fishbone Church, was published in 1998 and was widely praised in New Zealand and overseas, winning the Hubert Church Award for Best First Book of Fiction at the New Zealand Book Awards in 1998. The writer Nick Hornby said "Catherine Chidgey is a wonderful new talent, and In a Fishbone Church marks the beginning of what promises to be a glorious literary career". Louis de Bernières called the novel "warm, subtle and evocative. You will be thinking about it long after you have finished reading". In 1999 In a Fishbone Church won Best First Book at the Commonwealth Writers' Prize (South East Asia and Pacific Region). It also won a Betty Trask Award for a first book (UK), and was longlisted for the Orange Prize for Fiction (UK).

Her second novel, Golden Deeds, was published in 2000, and was runner-up for the Deutz Medal for Fiction at the 2000 New Zealand Book Awards. It was published by Picador in the UK and by Henry Holt in the US (under the title The Strength of the Sun), where it was a 2002 Notable Book of the Year in The New York Times Book Review, and a 2002 Best Book in the LA Times Book Review. The Times Literary Supplement called it "magnanimous and merciless, a work reminiscent at times of darkest Atwood ... A witty and melancholy alchemy of heat and chill, a work of craft and fluency, which revitalizes the book in all its guises ... for those who love books, Catherine Chidgey is a find". The Sunday Express called it "a wonderful, gripping read. Human relations and needs are explored in all their complexity. Chidgey proves herself to be among that elite group of authors who possess a true grasp of the patterns of life". The Independent on Sunday said the novel "ensnares you, creeps up and snaffles you with its small, tense concerns. I could not stop thinking about it. I could not put it down ... I finished Golden Deeds with that delicious and rare feeling: that I was in the presence of a proper, grown-up storyteller who cared not a toss for gimmicks or manifestoes, but dared instead to put her case with real authorial power and verve".

The Transformation, Chidgey's third novel, was published in 2003, and that year she was named New Zealand's best novelist under forty by The New Zealand Listener.<ref>Carolyn Bain, George Dunford, Lonely Planet New Zealand, pp. 48, Lonely Planet, 2006, .</ref> The book tells the story of a shadowy Parisian wig-maker who flees to Tampa, Florida in the 1890s. The Sunday Times said that "Chidgey spins a horror story which, miraculously avoiding easy sensationalism, is both troubling and haunting", and the New Zealand Herald said it was "her third and best so far ... Chidgey could tackle any subject and produce something wonderful from it. She has that gift of the imagination that finds metaphor, contiguity and paradox wherever she looks, and a seemingly innate feel for structuring events, times and historical detail to make one whole, satisfying narrative out of a myriad unexpected parts". The Sunday Express remarked, "This really is a novel to get lost in ...  A highly original read, as beautiful as it is terrifying, which manages to be riotously chilling without ever going over the top".

Later novels
Her fourth novel, The Wish Child, set in Nazi Germany, was published in New Zealand in 2016 and was an instant bestseller, winning the 2017 Acorn Foundation Fiction Prize at the Ockham New Zealand Book Awards—the country's richest literary prize. Radio New Zealand called it "a brilliant, brilliant novel ... a masterpiece". The New Zealand Herald found it "meticulously crafted and superbly written ... provocative, haunting, intelligent and lyrical ... breath-taking... It will stay with you long after you finish the final page". The Sunday Star-Times commented "Right from the first sentences I was caught up in the exquisite lure of the writing: musical, clear, lovingly tended. Nothing seems forced ... I loved this book with its subterranean mysteries and spiky issues. I love the way, at this critical point in the world, when fundamental human values are violated, The Wish Child reminds us with grace and understated wisdom of a need to strive for universal good. I ached as I read. This novel is unmissable". It was published in the UK in July 2017 by Chatto & Windus, with The Times calling it "a remarkable book with a stunningly original twist". In October 2018 Counterpoint published it in the US as a lead Fall title.

Her fifth book was released in November 2017. A 'found' novel, The Beat of the Pendulum was written during 2016, with Chidgey drawing on newspaper articles, Facebook posts, emails, radio broadcasts, books, street signs and conversations to create an entry for every day of the year. Radio New Zealand selected it as a Best Book of 2017, calling it "Important in terms of its form as much as its content ... sensationally clever writing ... an enormously skilled writer who totally gets the craft". It was longlisted for the Ockham New Zealand Book Awards and was published in the UK by Lightning Books in 2019.

Chidgey's sixth book, Remote Sympathy, was published in 2020, and like The Wish Child is set in Nazi Germany. It was shortlisted for the 2021 Ockham New Zealand Book Awards. It was a Sunday Times Book of the Month, and was described by The Guardian as "immersive, profound and beautifully plotted". Publishers Weekly praised Chidgey's exploration of the intersecting stories of former Nazis and Holocaust survivors, concluding: "With its multiple registers and complex view of humanity, this marks a vital turn in Holocaust literature". It was one of New Zealand's top ten best-selling novels in 2021, was shortlisted for the 2022 International Dublin Literary Award, and was longlisted for the 2022 Women's Prize for Fiction. In 2022 it was named by The Guardian as one of the best books of the year.

In October 2022, her seventh novel, The Axeman's Carnival, was published. Set in Central Otago, the novel tells the story of the relationship of a farming couple and is narrated by a magpie called Tama. Chidgey drew from her husband's family's farming experiences in writing the novel. Rachael King, reviewing the book for Newsroom, described it as "remarkable, brilliant, a classic in the making", with Tama's voice providing "dark poetry, dramatic irony, startling wisdom and trickster delights". The book featured eighth on the list of New Zealand fiction bestsellers of 2022.

Other works
, Chidgey is a senior lecturer of creative writing at the University of Waikato and has also taught at the Manukau Institute of Technology. In her role at Waikato she founded the Sargeson Prize, New Zealand's richest short story competition.

Chidgey has translated more than a dozen children's picture books from the German for Gecko Press. In November 2019, OneTree House published her first original picture book, Jiffy, Cat Detective, illustrated by Astrid Matijasevich. A follow-up, Jiffy's Greatest Hits, was published in 2022.

 Awards and honours 
 1997 Adam Foundation Prize for In a Fishbone Church 1998 Todd New Writer's Bursary
 1998 Sargeson Fellowship
 1999 Betty Trask Award for In a Fishbone Church 1999 Best First Book, Commonwealth Writers' Prize (South East Asia and Pacific Region) for In a Fishbone Church 2001 Katherine Mansfield Memorial Fellowship to Menton, France
 2002 Prize in Modern Letters
 2003 Writer in Residence, University of Canterbury
 2005-6 Robert Burns Fellow, University of Otago
 2008 Rathcoola Residency, County Cork, Ireland
 2009 Writer in Residence, University of Waikato
 2010  University of Otago Wallace Residency, The Pah Homestead, Auckland
 2012  New Zealand Society of Authors Beatson Fellowship
 2013 Katherine Mansfield Short Story Award for 'Reverse Living'
 2017 Acorn Foundation Fiction Prize at the Ockham New Zealand Book Awards for The Wish Child 2017 Janet Frame Fiction Prize
 2018 International Dublin Literary Award (longlisted) for The Wish Child 2022 Women's Prize for Fiction (longlisted) for Remote Sympathy 2022 International Dublin Literary Award (shortlisted) for Remote Sympathy 2023 Jann Medlicott Acorn Prize for Fiction (shortlisted), Ockham New Zealand Book Awards for The Axeman's Carnival''

See also

 New Zealand literature

References

External links 
 Read NZ Te Pou Muramura profile
 University of Waikato profile
 

1970 births
Living people
New Zealand women novelists
Victoria University of Wellington alumni
20th-century New Zealand novelists
21st-century New Zealand novelists
20th-century New Zealand women writers
21st-century New Zealand women writers
People from Auckland
People educated at Sacred Heart College, Lower Hutt